Most Rev. Patrick Joseph Carew (1800 – 2 November 1855) was the Vicar Apostolic of Western Bengal.

Biography
Patrick Joseph Carew was born in Waterford, Ireland. Carew studied for the priesthood in Maynooth, he was appointed Professor of Humanity in 1826. On 6 March 1838, Pope Gregory XVI appointed him Vicar Apostolic of Madras and Titular Bishop of Philadelphia in Arabia.

On 24 June 1838, he was consecrated bishop by John Murphy, Bishop of Cork with Nicholas Foran, Bishop of Waterford and Lismore, and Francis Haly, Bishop of Kildare and Leighlin as Co-Consecrators. On 4 April 1840, he succeeded to the Vicar Apostolic of Madras replacing Bishop Daniel O'Connor.

On 30 November 1840, he was appointed Vicar Apostolic of Bengal and Titular Archbishop of Edessa in Osrhoëne. In 1850, the name of the vicariate was changed to the Vicariate Apostolic of Western Bengal. After several months of illness, Carew died on 2 November 1855 at the Archbishop's residence in Calcutta, aged 55.

References

External links
 

1800 births
1855 deaths
Bishops appointed by Pope Gregory XVI
People from County Waterford
Date of birth unknown
Place of death unknown
Alumni of St Patrick's College, Maynooth
Irish expatriate Catholic bishops